Kenny Higgins (born September 21, 1982) is a former gridiron football wide receiver. He was originally signed by the San Diego Chargers as an undrafted free agent in 2005. He played college football at Toledo.

Higgins also played for the Memphis Xplorers, Nashville Kats, Grand Rapids Rampage, and Toronto Argonauts.

External links
Toronto Argonauts bio

1982 births
Living people
Players of American football from Long Beach, California
Players of Canadian football from Long Beach, California
American players of Canadian football
Toledo Rockets football players
American football wide receivers
Canadian football wide receivers
San Diego Chargers players
Memphis Xplorers players
Nashville Kats players
Grand Rapids Rampage players
Toronto Argonauts players
Chicago Rush players